is a dam in Asago, Hyōgo Prefecture, Japan.

References 

Dams in Hyogo Prefecture
Dams completed in 1984